Ahmad ibn 'Abdallah Habash Hasib Marwazi (766d. after 869 in Samarra, modern Iraq) was a north-eastern Iranian astronomer, geographer, and mathematician from Merv in Khorasan, who was the first to describe the trigonometric ratios sine, cosine, tangent, and cotangent.

Habash flourished in Baghdad, and died a centenarian some time after 869. He worked under two Abbasid caliphs, al-Ma'mun and al-Mu'tasim.

Work
Ahmad ibn 'Abdallah Habash Hasib Marwazi made astronomical observations from 100 to 2035, and compiled three zijes (astronomical tables): the first were still in the Hindu manner; the second, called the 'tested" tables, were the most important; they are likely identical with the "Ma'munic" or "Arabic" tables and may be a collective work of al-Ma'mun's  astronomers; the third, called tables of the Shah, were smaller.

Apropos of the solar eclipse of 829, Habash gives us the first instance of a determination of time by an altitude (in this case, of the sun); a method  which was generally adopted by Muslim astronomers.

In 830, he seems to have introduced the notion of  "shadow", umbra (versa), equivalent to our tangent in trigonometry, and he compiled a table of such shadows which seems to be the earliest of its kind. He also introduced the cotangent, and produced the first tables of for it.

The Book of Bodies and Distances
Al-Hasib conducted various observations at the Al-Shammisiyyah observatory in Baghdad and estimated a number of geographic and astronomical values. He compiled his results in The Book of Bodies and Distances, in which some of his results included the following:

Earth
Earth's circumference: 20,160 miles (32,444 km)
Earth's diameter: 6414.54 miles (10323.201 km)
Earth radius: 3207.275 miles (5161.609 km)

Moon
Moon's diameter: 1886.8 miles (3036.5 km)
Moon's circumference: 5927.025 miles (9538.622 km)
Radius of closest distance of Moon: 215,208;9,9 (sexagesimal) miles
Half-circumference of closest distance of Moon: 676,368;28,45,25,43 (sexagesimal) miles
Radius of furthest distance of Moon: 205,800;8,45 (sexagesimal) miles
Diameter of furthest distance of Moon: 411,600.216 miles (662,406.338 km)
Circumference of furthest distance of Moon: 1,293,600.916 miles (2,081,848.873 km)

Sun
Sun's diameter: 35,280;1,30 miles (56,777.6966 km)
Sun's circumference: 110,880;4,43 miles (178,444.189 km)
Diameter of orbit of Sun: 7,761,605.5 miles (12,491,093.2 km)
Circumference of orbit of Sun: 24,392,571.38 miles (39,256,038 km)
One degree along orbit of Sun: 67,700.05 miles (108,952.67 km)
One minute along orbit of Sun: 1129.283 miles (1817.405 km)

See also
List of Muslim scientists
List of pre-modern Iranian scientists and scholars

Notes

References
  (PDF version)

External links
Handbuch der Geschichte : aus den Handschriften der k.k. Hofbibliothek zu Wien, der herzoglichen Bibliothek zu Gotha und der Universitäts-Bibliothek zu Leyden (1850), ed.: Ferdinand Wüstenfeld
An extract from Ibn Kutaiba's 'Adab al-Kâtib; or, The writer's guide (1877), ed.: William Oliver Sproull
Ibn Kutaiba's Adab-al-kâtib. Nach mehreren Handschriften hrsg. von Max Grünert (1900), ed.: Max Grünert
 Liber poesis et poetarum (1904), ed.: Michael Jan de Goeje

874 deaths
People from Merv
9th-century Iranian mathematicians
Scientists who worked on qibla determination
9th-century Iranian astronomers
Year of birth unknown
Men centenarians
Iranian centenarians
766 births
Mathematicians from the Abbasid Caliphate
Astronomers from the Abbasid Caliphate
Astronomers of the medieval Islamic world